Canal 5 Noticias ("Channel 5 News", also known as C5N) is an Argentine pay television news channel launched on 6 August 2007.

Gallery

External links 
 

24-hour television news channels in Argentina
Spanish-language television stations
Television channels and stations established in 2007
Mass media in Buenos Aires
2007 establishments in Argentina